William Morris Stewart (August 9, 1827April 23, 1909) was an American lawyer and politician. In 1964, he was inducted into the Hall of Great Westerners of the National Cowboy & Western Heritage Museum.

Personal
Stewart was born in Wayne County, New York, on August 9, 1825. As a child he moved with his parents to Trumbull County, Ohio. As a young man he was a mathematics teacher in Ohio. In 1849 he began attending Yale University but left in 1850 to move to California. He came to California because of the Gold Rush. He arrived in San Francisco, California and soon left to begin mining near Nevada City, California.

In 1903 he was reputed to be one of the richest men in the Senate (with a fortune of some $25 million and ownership of silver mines) and the oldest member of that body.

Marriages
Stewart was married to Annie Elizabeth Foote, daughter of his law partner, Henry S. Foote, on May 31, 1855.

His second wife was May Agnes Cone, widow of Theodore C. Cone. They were wed on October 26, 1903, in the Piedmont Hotel, Atlanta, Georgia. Judge Thomas M. Norwood, who had served with Stewart in the U.S. Senate was the best man.

According to the book Reminiscences of William M. Stewart (1908) in May 1905 he moved with his new wife and her daughter to the Bullfrog Mining District (Nevada), where he started a law firm and law library.

Political career

California

In 1851 Stewart ran for sheriff of Nevada County, California, and the next year, in February, he was at the Whig State Convention in Sacramento, where he was named a delegate to the party's national convention.

In 1852 he studied law in the office of Nevada County District Attorney John R. McConnell, becoming a Democrat in the process. He was appointed to succeed McConnell as district attorney in November 1852. At that time he became a "motivating force" in beginning a Democratic newspaper, Young America (later called The Nevada Democrat.) Stewart continued as district attorney after an election in November 1853.

He was acting attorney general of California from June 7, 1853, until December.

Stewart moved to San Francisco and became a law partner with Henry S. Foote, Louis Aldrick, and Benjamin Watkins Lee.

Nevada

State
In 1860 Stewart moved to Virginia City, Nevada where he participated in mining litigation and helped the development of the Comstock Lode.  As Nevada was becoming a state in 1864, he helped the state develop its constitution.  Stewart's role as a lawyer and politician in Nevada has always been controversial.  He was the territory's leading lawyer in mining litigation, but his opponents accused him of bribing judges and juries.  Stewart accused the three Nevada territorial judges of being corrupt, and he barely escaped disbarment.

United States Senate
In 1864, Stewart was named by the Nevada State Legislature to the United States Senate as a Republican. He served in the Senate from 1865 until 1875 when he retired and practiced law again in Nevada and California. In 1873, Stewart's palatial residence, nicknamed Stewart's Castle, was built in Washington, D.C. and became a center of the city's social scene. He was elected to the Senate again in 1887 and reelected in 1893 and 1899. During the 1890s he left the Republican Party to join the Silver Party, which supported the Free Silver movement. During this time, he caucused with the Silver Republicans.

During his many years in the Senate, Stewart drafted or co-authored important legislation, including several mining acts and laws urging land reclamation by irrigation. Most famously, Stewart is given credit for authoring in 1868 the Fifteenth Amendment to the United States Constitution protecting voting rights regardless of race, color, or previous condition of servitude. During his time as senator, Stewart received 50,000 acres of land for his service on the Committee on Pacific Railroads.  In 1871, President Ulysses S. Grant offered Stewart a seat on the United States Supreme Court. Stewart declined.  Stewart was also involved in an international scandal where he promoted the sale of a worthless worked out Emma Silver Mine at Alta, Utah for millions of pounds to unsuspecting English citizens.

In 1902, he was in The Hague in connection with the Mexican-American arbitration case, when his wife, the daughter of Confederate Senator Henry S. Foote, was killed in a motor-car accident in Alameda, California.

Post-political career

Stewart retired from the Senate in 1905. He was a co-founder of the city of Chevy Chase, Maryland, along with Francis G. Newlands, a fellow Senator from Nevada. Stewart remained in Washington, D.C. and died there four years later. He was cremated and the ashes were originally kept in Laurel Hill Cemetery in San Francisco before being moved to Cypress Lawn Memorial Park in Colma, California.

In popular culture
The actor Howard Negley (1898-1983) played Stewart in the 1953 episode, "The Bandits of Panamint", of the syndicated television anthology series, Death Valley Days, hosted by Stanley Andrews. In the story line, Stewart enters into an agreement to gain pardons for two bandits, played Rick Vallin and Glase Lohman, who accidentally stumble upon a rich silver strike. Stewart, however gains ownership of the mine. Sheila Ryan and Gloria Winters played young women with romantic interests in the outlaws.

In another 1953 episode of Death Valley Days, "Whirlwind Courtship", Michael Hathaway, who appeared only twice on television, played Stewart as a young Nevada lawyer determined to wed Annie Foote, a daughter of former U.S. Senator Henry S. Foote of Mississippi, who had relocated to the West.

In a 1954 episode of Death Valley Days, entitled "The Light on the Mountain," the role of Stewart was played by Michael Colgan (1921-2006). In the story line, Stewart and Richard Corey (Glase Lohman) attempt to clean up the justice system in Nevada in preparation for statehood in 1864. Phyllis Coates played Stewart's wife, Annie. Angie Dickinson was cast as Sabina Harris, a young woman with an interest in Corey.

See also
List of United States senators who switched parties

References

External links
 William M. Stewart, The Online Books Page, University of Pennsylvania

1827 births
1909 deaths
People from Wayne County, New York
American people of Scotch-Irish descent
Nevada Republicans
Republican Party United States senators from Nevada
Silver Party United States senators from Nevada
California Attorneys General
Stanford University trustees
People of Nevada in the American Civil War
Burials at Cypress Lawn Memorial Park
19th-century American politicians
Burials at Laurel Hill Cemetery (San Francisco)